Reşadiye is a district of Tokat located within the Cappadocia land within the Kızılırmak arc in the central part of the Black Sea. It is on the E E80 highway, on the edge of the Kelkit Stream. Reşadiye is surrounded by Ordu in the north, Almus in the south, Niksar and Başçiftlik in the west and Sivas in the southeast. According to the 2020 TUIK data, its total population is 43,870.

Geography 
Geographically, it is located between 400 31 'north latitudes and 370 06' east longitudes and the highest hill of Reşadiye, established on the banks of the Kelkit River, is Erdem Baba Hill with 2.183 meters. This is followed by Küçük Erdem Hill (2.113 meters), Kabaktepe (2.037 meters), Çal Hill (2.022 meters), Mektep Hill, Tömbül Hill and Lalelik Hill. All of these heights are located in Günüş Mountain. Zinav Lake is located within the boundaries of the district.

Terror Attacks 
The town was the scene of two major insurgent attacks during the Kurdish-Turkish conflict, the first one being the Sazak assault in 1997, a joint operation between the PKK, DHKP/C and the TKP/ML, killing 4 soldiers and the second being the Reşadiye shooting in 2009 in which the PKK killed 7 and injured 3 soldiers.

Notable people
Hüseyin Özer, Turkish-British executive chef and restaurateur

References

Populated places in Tokat Province
Districts of Tokat Province